Rui da Silva (born 5 January 1939) is a Macau-born Hong Kong field hockey player. He competed in the men's tournament at the 1964 Summer Olympics.

References

External links
 

1939 births
Living people
Macanese people
Macau emigrants to Hong Kong
Hong Kong male field hockey players
Olympic field hockey players of Hong Kong
Field hockey players at the 1964 Summer Olympics
Hong Kong people of Macanese descent